Rafał Gikiewicz (born 26 October 1987) is a Polish professional footballer who plays as a goalkeeper for Bundesliga club FC Augsburg.

Club career
Gikiewicz was born in Olsztyn. In July 2008, he moved to Jagiellonia Białystok. In August 2010, he was loaned to OKS 1945 Olsztyn on a one-year deal. He returned to Jagiellonia Białystok half a year later.

In January 2011, he joined Śląsk Wrocław on 4.5-year contract.

In April 2014, German club Eintracht Braunschweig announced the signing of Gikiewicz for the 2014–15 season. In August 2016, Gikiewicz transferred to Freiburg.

In June 2018, Gikiewicz moved to Union Berlin signing a two-year contract. The transfer fee paid to Freiburg was reported as €200,000. On 7 October 2018, Gikiewicz scored a 94th-minute equalizer against 1. FC Heidenheim in the 2. Bundesliga.
On 1 July 2020, he signed with Bundesliga club FC Augsburg.

International career
Due to his successful career in Union Berlin, in May 2019 he received his first call-up to the Poland national team for the first time, during the UEFA Euro 2020 qualifying Group G matches against North Macedonia and Israel, but remained unused on the bench.

Personal life
His twin brother Łukasz Gikiewicz is also a footballer.

Gikiewicz follows a vegan diet.

Career statistics

Club

1 Including Ekstraklasa Cup.
2 Including Polish Super Cup.
3 Including Bundesliga promotion play-offs.

Honours
Jagiellonia Białystok
 Polish Cup: 2009–10

Śląsk Wrocław
 Polish Ekstraklasa: 2011–12
 Polish Super Cup: 2012

References

External links
 

1987 births
Living people
Sportspeople from Olsztyn
Polish footballers
Association football goalkeepers
Sokół Ostróda players
Wigry Suwałki players
Jagiellonia Białystok players
OKS Stomil Olsztyn players
Śląsk Wrocław players
Eintracht Braunschweig players
SC Freiburg players
1. FC Union Berlin players
FC Augsburg players
II liga players
Ekstraklasa players
2. Bundesliga players
Bundesliga players
Polish expatriate footballers
Expatriate footballers in Germany
Polish expatriate sportspeople in Germany